The Queen's Head is a  public house at 54 Windsor Street, Uxbridge, London.

The Grade II listed building is constructed of brick and dates from the early-mid 19th century.

References

Grade II listed buildings in the London Borough of Hillingdon
Grade II listed pubs in London
Pubs in the London Borough of Hillingdon
Uxbridge